Croll is the surname of:

 Alexander Angus Croll, (1811-1887) British civil engineer
 Dan Croll (born 1990), British singer-songwriter
 David Croll (1900–1991), Canadian politician
 Doña Croll (born 1953), Jamaican-born British actress
 Hacker Croll, real name François Cousteix, French computer hacker
 James Croll (1821–1890), Scottish scientist who developed a theory of climate change
 Jimmy Croll (1920–2008), American race horse trainer
 Joan Croll (1928–2022), Australian physician and radiologist
 June Croll (1901-1967), U.S. labor organizer
 Maria de Croll (died 1710), Swedish vocalist
 Oswald Croll or Crollius (c. 1563–1609), German physician, alchemist and botanist
 Sebastian Croll, 17th-century Dutchman who introduced the cruller to the Americas
 William Martin Croll (1866–1929), U.S. politician from Pennsylvania

In other uses
 Croll Building in Alameda, California
 Petzl Croll rope ascending device
 Croll Glacier a glacier in Antarctica

See also
 Kroll